The Essential Ozzy Osbourne is a compilation album by British heavy metal singer Ozzy Osbourne, released in 2003. It reached No. 81 on US charts and No. 21 in the UK. Tracks featured here from the first two albums are the re-recorded versions from recent reissues (see Blizzard of Ozz and Diary of a Madman) as well as the remixed Bark at the Moon tracks. The album was certified Gold by the RIAA on 5 February 2005 with an excess of 500,000 copies sold, then certified Platinum by the RIAA on 3 March 2016. This compilation was re-released in 2009 as a Limited Edition 3.0 package with an additional disc of bonus songs that were not on the original release.

The album tracks from Blizzard of Ozz and Diary of a Madman are from the 2002 remasters, for which they were partially re-recorded. The original drum and bass tracks were replaced with recordings by Osbourne's then-current bassist Robert Trujillo and drummer Mike Bordin, as a management response to legal action by original bassist Bob Daisley and drummer Lee Kerslake for unpaid royalty fees.

It does not feature any material from 1986's The Ultimate Sin.

Track listing 

Some non-US pressings of the compilation omit track 12 on the first disc ("So Tired"). On these editions, "Breaking All the Rules" is added to the end of that disc (as the 16th track), and is thus omitted as the first track of the second disc.

Charts

Weekly charts

Year-end charts

Certifications

References

Ozzy Osbourne compilation albums
2003 greatest hits albums
Epic Records compilation albums
Universal Music Group compilation albums
Sony Music compilation albums